Yanglin Township is a rural township in Shaoshan City, Xiangtan City, Hunan Province, China.

Administrative division
The township is divided into 13 villages: Shiping Village, Chunhe Village, Lianghe Village, Xinxi Village, Waping Village, Lianyi Village, Linye Village, Yanglin Village, Shanfu Village, Moshi Village, Baige Village, Fengxing Village, Yunyuan Village, Tuantian Village, and Shutang Village.

Attractions
Bao'en Temple is a Buddhism temple in the town.

Celebrity
 Peng Shaohui, a general in the People's Liberation Army.

References

External links

Divisions of Shaoshan
Townships of Hunan